Perkins Lake is a lake on the central Oregon Coast that is located in the Oregon dunes along Highway 101, in Douglas County.  It is approximately five-to-six acres in size and it is stocked with rainbow trout by the Oregon Department of Fish and Wildlife.

See also 
 List of lakes in Oregon

References

Lakes of Oregon
Lakes of Douglas County, Oregon